Krzysztof Jan Janik (pronounced ; born 11 June 1950 in Kielce) is a Polish left-wing politician. He is a member of the Democratic Left Alliance and from 6 March 2004 to 18 December 2004 was the leader of this party.

He was Ministers of Internal Affairs and Administration from 2001 to 2004 when he resigned. He was also a member of the parliament from 1993 to 2005.

References

1950 births
Living people
Politicians from Kielce
Democratic Left Alliance politicians
Members of the Polish Sejm 1993–1997
Members of the Polish Sejm 1997–2001
Members of the Polish Sejm 2001–2005
Interior ministers of Poland